Balinese dance is an ancient dance tradition that is part of the religious and artistic expression among the Balinese people of Bali island, Indonesia. Balinese dance is dynamic, angular and intensely expressive. Balinese dancers express the stories of dance-drama through the bodily gestures including gestures of fingers, hands, head and eyes.

There is a great richness of dance forms and styles in Bali; and particularly notable are those ritualistic dance dramas which involve Rangda, the witch, and the great beast Barong. Most of the dances in Bali are connected to Hindu or traditional folk rituals, such as the Sanghyang Dedari sacred dance that invoke benevolent hyang spirits, believed to possess the dancers in a trance state during the performance. Other Balinese dances are not linked to religious rituals and are created for certain occasions or purposes, such as the Baris or Pendet welcoming dances and Joged dance, that is social dance for entertainment.

Recognition and conservation
During the Intergovernmental Committee for the Safeguarding of the Intangible Cultural Heritage convention in 29 November to 4 December 2015 in Windhoek, Namibia, UNESCO recognizes three genres of traditional dance in Bali, Indonesia, as Intangible cultural heritage. The three genres includes Wali (sacred dances), Bebali (semi-sacred dances) and Balih-balihan (dances for entertainment purposes). Balinese dance has been proposed since 2011, and officially recognized in 2015.

The three genres are represented by nine dances, which describes its function and living tradition in Balinese community, they are:

Wali Sacred Dances
 Rejang (Klungkung District). Sacred ceremonial dance by young women in traditional ceremonial dress,
 Sanghyang Dedari (Karangasem District). Sacred trance dance to counteract negative supernatural forces. Performed by two young girls.
 Baris Upacara (Bangli District) religious dances conveying heroic spirit danced by even numbers of male dancers.

Bebali Semi Sacred Dances
 Topeng Sidhakarya/Topeng Pajegan (Tabanan District). Performed by masked dancers to neutralize the evil spirits.
 Gambuh dance drama (Gianyar District). Formerly royal theatrical performance,  now accompaniment to ceremonies, by 25-40 dancers.
 Wayang Wong dance drama (Buleleng District). Combines dance, epic drama and music.

Balih-balihan Entertainment Dances
 Legong Kraton (Denpasar City). Exquisitely beautiful dance by 2 or 3 girls.  Developed from Sanghyang Dedari, and Gambuh.
 Joged Bumbung (Buleleng District). A popular social dance by couples, during harvest season or on important days.
 Barong Ket "Kuntisraya" (Badung District). Represents a fight between two mythological characters, Barong in the form of a lion symbolizing goodness and Rangda, an evil witch.

Significance

In Hinduism, dance is an accompaniment to the perpetual dissolving and reforming of the world. The creative and reproductive balance is often personified as Shiva's wife, Durga, sometimes called Uma, Parvati, or Kali. This has significance in Balinese Hinduism, since the common figure of Rangda is similar in many ways to Durga.

Variants

In Bali there are various categories of dance, including epic performances such as the omnipresent Mahabharata and Ramayana.
Certain ceremonies at village temples feature a special performance of a dance-drama, a battle between the mythical characters Rangda, the witch representing the evil, and Barong, the lion or dragon, representing the good. This type of performance was traditionally featured during outbreaks of epidemic diseases which were believed by the people to be a result of a disturbance in the balance of the 'good and bad forces', which were represented by the Rangda and the Barong. The battle usually reconciles in harmony or balance of the Rangda and the Barong, instead of a defeat of the evil.

Among the dance traditions in Bali are:
Barong, king of the spirits
Baris war dances
Cendrawasih, the bird of paradise
Condong, a basic dance, preface to Legong
Legong, a refined dance
Kecak, the Ramayana monkey chant dance
Janger, a sitting dance with swaying movements
Pendet, a simple dance performed before making an offering at a temple
Tenun, a dance describes women weaving the cloth
Topeng, a mask dance

Traditionally, sacred dances can only be performed in temples. However, new choreographies have been created due to the demand from tourists. One example, Tari Sekar Jagat (Tari means dance in the Balinese language), is a relatively new choreography that has become popular. In the newer creations, choreographers have more freedom over the moves. They use new moves that were considered 'improper' for the sacred dances. For example, in Tari Sekar Jagat, there is a move when the dancers hold the Dulang below their shoulders. This ceremonial pedestal, which may be wooden or ceramic, is normally held high in accordance with its sacredness. Below shoulder level but above the navel represents an ordinary or everyday state.

Technique

Bali dancers learn the craft as children, they are played Balinese music. They are taught to dance with their hands before they can walk. Official training as a Bali dancer starts as young as 7. In Balinese dance the movement is closely associated with the rhythms produced by the gamelan, a musical ensemble specific to Java and Bali. Multiple levels of articulations in the face, eyes, hands, arms, hips, and feet are coordinated to reflect layers of percussive sounds.

The number of codified hand positions and gestures, the mudras, is higher in India than in Java or Bali. It has been speculated that they have been forgotten as the dance was transmitted from India to Java. Hand positions and gestures are nonetheless as important in Javanese and Balinese dance as in India. Whether in India, Indonesia or Cambodia, hands have a typically ornamental role and emphasize the dance's delicate intricacy.

Gallery

See also

 Dance in Indonesia
 Javanese dance
 Sundanese dance
 Dance of Cambodia
 Dance of Thailand
 Theatre in Bali
 Hinduism in Bali
 Dance in mythology and religion
 List of basic dance topics
 List of dance style categories
 List of dances

References

External links
 

Balinese culture
Dances of Indonesia
Dances of Bali
Ritual dances
Partial squatting position